Anerastia incarnata is a species of snout moth in the genus Anerastia. It was described by Staudinger, 1879. It is found on Sicily.

References

External links
lepiforum.de

Moths described in 1879
Anerastiini
Endemic fauna of Italy
Moths of Europe